Vernonia djalonensis is a critically endangered species of plants in the family Asteraceae. It is native to the West African country of Guinea.

In a 2018 public vote, Vernonia djalonensis was voted as the national flower of Guinea, a decision which is currently awaiting government approval.

References 

djalonensis
Flora of Guinea
National symbols of Guinea